Bela decussata is a species of sea snail, a marine gastropod mollusk in the family Mangeliidae.

Taxonomy
The accepted name of this species is neither a primary homonym, nor currently a secondary homonym of Bela decussata (Couthouy, 1839), synonym of Curtitoma decussata (Couthouy, 1839)  (originally described as Pleurotoma decussatum)

Description
The length of the shell attains 5 mm.

Distribution
This marine species occurs in Atlantic France.

References

 Locard A. (1892). Les coquilles marines des côtes de France. Paris, J.B. Baillière & fils : pp. 384
 Gofas, S.; Le Renard, J.; Bouchet, P. (2001). Mollusca, in: Costello, M.J. et al. (Ed.) (2001). European register of marine species: a check-list of the marine species in Europe and a bibliography of guides to their identification. Collection Patrimoines Naturels, 50: pp. 180–213

External links
 

decussata